The Volvo S80 is an executive car produced by the Swedish manufacturer Volvo Cars from 1998 to 2016 across two generations. It took the place of the rear-wheel-drive S90 as Volvo's flagship sedan.

The first generation (1998–2006) was made available for the 1999 model year. It has since been built at the Torslanda Works in Gothenburg, Sweden, with a few 1999 model year cars for the North American market built at Volvo's Halifax Assembly plant. Unlike most Volvo models, it did not have a station wagon version for its first generation.

The second generation (2006–2016) was released in 2006 as a model year 2007 car. It has an estate version, the third generation of the Volvo V70. In June 2007, the S80 scored the highest "good" rating in the Insurance Institute for Highway Safety (IIHS) crash test performance for frontal, side, and rear impacts, earning it the IIHS Top Safety Pick.

The model was replaced by the second generation S90 in the later half of 2016.



First generation (1998–2006) 

The design takes styling cues from the Volvo ECC concept. The first-generation S80 is based on the Volvo P2 platform. Over 368,000 first-generation S80s were built. The S80 featured a straight-six engine in a transverse engine mounting. No existing manual gearbox would fit in the engine bay with the six-cylinder engine, so Volvo had to develop their own, the M65. It featured also an environmental specification, covering aspects such as allergens from textiles, fuel economy and the life cycle of the car from production to dismantling.

Volvo continued its safety tradition, offering front and rear integrated crumple zones, driver and front passenger dual threshold airbags with a collapsible three-stage steering column, Side Impact Protection System (SIPS) supplemented with air bags for driver and front passenger, along with a side curtain airbag for front and rear passengers, anti-submarine seats, five padded head restraints with Whiplash Protection System (WHIPS), and automatic seat belt pretensioners while front belts also have height adjustment.

The S80 was initially available with four different engines. Starting the range was a detuned 2.4-litre  five-cylinder. This was also available as a compressed natural gas (CNG) and as a liquefied petroleum gas (LPG) version. The fully tuned version produced . Next up was a 2.9-litre  six-cylinder, then  T6, and finally, the  2.5-litre Volkswagen-sourced Turbocharged Direct Injection (TDI) diesel engine. The 2.9 has a straight-six engine, while the T6 was powered by a de-bored twin-turbocharged version. The S80 used CAN bus multiplexing wiring to simplify the various electronic components and safety systems and linking the various ECU to save complexity and weight.

In 2000, there was the addition of the  2.5T, available with standard all-wheel drive. The 2.5T model featured a light-pressure turbocharger. and addition of the  2.3T, available in Thailand Version. These were sold in countries such as Portugal where larger capacity engines were penalized by heavy taxes.

In 2004 PremAir was introduced as a standard feature to the exterior radiator surface which converts up to 75 percent of ground level ozone in the radiator cooling air into oxygen, while the Interior Air Quality System cleans the air inside, detects for pollutants and automatically recirculates in comparison to the air outside. The upholstery was available in taupe, light sand or graphite and the leathers were tanned using natural plant materials. The S80 sheet metal content can be recycled, along with other metals that achieved an 85 overall percentage. Dual zone climate control and heated front seats along with a three position drivers memory setting were optional, and anti-smash and grab laminated side windows were available. Retractable sunshades for the rear side door windows and an electronically extendable rear window sunshade were available

The S80 came standard with Volvo's own radio unit, the HU-613, the HU-803 and was later upgraded to the HU-650 and an optional extra HU-850 unit. The HU-850 unit features a 225 or 335-watt power output (depending on optional external amplifier) with three presets: 2CH, 3CH and Dolby Digital Pro Logic II Surround Sound. The Four-C electronically modified suspension became an option on some S80s.

Minor exterior design changes occurred between 2003 and 2004 versions, and in 2005 the Haldex-sourced AWD was available with the 2.5-litre five-cylinder turbo. In 2006 The AWD system was upgraded with a pre-charged, electronically controlled all-wheel drive system called Instant Traction, which consisted of constant hydraulic pressure that would divide available traction to the wheels as needed.

Engines

 *Volvo used a modified version of the 2.5 TDI VAG engine

Safety
Euro NCAP tested the first generation Volvo S80, running from 1998 to 2003.
They tested a left-hand drive, 4-door saloon, registered in 2000, with front seatbelt pretensioners, seatbelt load limiters, as well as front, side, body, and head airbags:

Scores given for the car showed pedestrians' legs facing a very aggressive front end, resulting in only 2 stars of 4 for pedestrian safety. Despite this Euro NCAP did state "This large Volvo is very safe and gave a good all-round performance" due to the good adult protection inside the car in the event of a collision.

Second generation (2006–2016) 

The second generation S80 was unveiled at the 2006 Geneva Motor Show on 28 February, with sales beginning in June 2006. The new S80 features a new 3.2-litre straight-six engine or 4.4-litre V8 engine, in combination with available four-wheel drive. The engine features four catalytic converters and advanced electronics. The structure featured high strength boron steel for safety.

The second generation S80 received the IIHS 2007 Top Safety Pick Award in overall safety protection. Also again in November the IIHS awarded the 2008 Volvo S80 with Top Safety Award.

The new S80 is based on the Ford EUCD platform, also used for vehicles including the Ford S-Max, third generation Ford Mondeo, and Ford Galaxy large MPVs. Volvo's Personal Car Communicator (PCC) remote control will also be an optional feature with the new S80.

The S80 is available with optional adaptive cruise control (ACC) with collision warning with auto brake (CWAB). Brake support offers additional assistance by preparing the braking system so that the car can begin stopping faster and preparing for panic brake application. S80 is also equipped with an adaptive brake light as standard which is active at speeds above , and can sense the difference between normal and panic braking. Ready alert brakes (RAB) are also available to anticipate severe braking. It prepares for this by moving the brake pads closer to the discs.

The T4 variant features the 1.6L turbocharged EcoBoost engine and is exclusively available in Asia and parts of Europe.

Second generation models

S80

S80L
The S80L is a long-wheelbase variant designed and sold only in China. Wheelbase and overall length have been increased by 14 cm. The S80L is one of two Volvo models produced under a joint-venture with Changan Ford Mazda Automobile (CFMA). CFMA production of the S80L commenced in 2009 and ceased in late 2015 when the joint-venture ended. The S80L has since been succeeded by the S90L.

2010 update
New features for 2010 include a choice of five-cylinder 2.4-litre D5 twin-turbo diesel, 2.4-litre diesel, or 1.6-litre diesel engine. Also the 2.5T and 2.5FT were modified to produce more power and have a lower fuel consumption. The update marked the last year of the Yamaha-based V8 engine. An option was added for California on the 3.2L Inline-6 to meet PZEV emissions standards. It had 225 bhp, 10 less than the non-PZEV engine. The car's exterior was modified to give the S80 a lower, longer and wider stance. More chrome trim was added to the front, the rear end, and the doors to look like the S80 Executive. The 2010 Volvo S80 facelift also comes with a choice between a comfort-enhancing standard chassis, or a sport one that offers better handling dynamics. The 2010 S80 will be available with a S80 R-design interior package to give the inside a sportier look. The interior package contains a new sports steering wheel, sports pedals, Dynamic leather seats, sports gearshift knob, and a new instrument with blue background.

The car was unveiled in 2009 at the Geneva Motor Show.

2011
The 2011 Volvo S80 lineup now includes the Inscription Package. Features Include: Sovereign Hide leather seats, high gloss walnut wood inlays, and special trim. The 3.2L was re-tuned, power and engine speed differ. The Dynaudio Premium Sound option is downgraded to 'Premium Sound'.

2012
The 2012 Volvo S80 now features a new 7-inch Sensus infotainment system in the center of the dash, genuine wood interior trim and Bluetooth audio streaming. Volvo's City Safety technology is also now standard. Premier Plus and Platinum trims are added for the 2012 model year.

2013 update
The 2013 Volvo S80 now features standard headlight washers, rain sensing wipers, and push button start ignition. The Premium Plus edition adds xenon headlamps.

2014 update
The 2nd half of year 2014 introduced a new facelift with new front and rear bumpers, new lower front fascia, new grille style, the 7-inch infotainment system becomes standard, City Safety becomes standard, new optional digital gauge cluster, and additional interior ambient lighting.

2015
The base 2015 Volvo S80 is powered by a new turbocharged 2.0-liter four-cylinder engine with 240 horsepower, which is the same output as the 3.2-liter six-cylinder in the 2014 model. A new eight-speed automatic transmission comes standard, and the base S80 also gets a new auto start/stop feature, which turns the engine off when the car is stopped to conserve fuel. The 2015 S80 achieves an EPA-estimated 25/37 mpg city/highway, which is a notable improvement over the 2014 model's 20/29 mpg rating. T6 AWD models come with a turbocharged 3.0-liter six-cylinder engine that produces 300 horsepower. A six-speed automatic transmission and all-wheel drive are also standard on T6 models. The T6 gets slightly better fuel economy than the 2014 model T6.

An optional climate package includes heated front and rear seats, a heated windshield and a heated steering wheel. The 2015 Volvo S80 went on sale in early 2014 and starts at $40,500 in the US.

2015.5
Introduced in late 2014, midyear changes introduced for the 2015.5 model include new standard Sensus Connect and Volvo On-Call with 6-month complimentary subscriptions, new Sensus Navigation with Map Care, and a new optional Harman/Kardon Premium Sound System. Most notably, the new 2015.5 model has significantly better fuel economy due to the more efficient "Drive-E" engine, new 8-speed "Geartronic" automatic transmission, and new ECO+ functionality with modified Start/Stop technology, ECO-coast and ECO-climate. The 2015.5 Volvo S80 starts at $41,450 in the US.

2016
The Volvo S80 offered an expanded array of standard features for 2016 which includes heated front seats, Interior Air Quality System (IAQS), power glass sunroof, and 18-inch "Magni" alloy wheels. The S80 T5 Drive-E Platinum trim gains Volvo's Blind Spot Information System (BLIS) as standard. New S80 options include a wood steering wheel and 19-inch "Bor" alloy wheels with a lowered Sport Chassis. The T6 six-cylinder engine and all-wheel-drive model have been discontinued for the 2016 model year. The 2016 Volvo S80 T5 FWD Drive-E started at $43,450 in the US. 2016 was the last model year for the S80. The S80s successor, the S90, was unveiled at the Detroit Auto Show in January 2016.

Engines

Safety

1 vehicle structure rated "Good"
2 strength-to-weight ratio: 4.26

Special versions
The S80 is also used as a base for specialised cars such as lengthened limousines, hearses, and ambulances. One company producing such models is Nilsson Special Vehicles, based in Laholm, Sweden. Ambulance models receive a completely new body from behind the b-pillar as well as a raised roof. A sliding side door is installed on the right hand side (sometimes on both sides) and the tailgate is enlarged to allow easier access. Nilsson only manufactured ambulances based on the first generation S80. Nilsson has built limousines and hearses based on both generations of the S80. They also manufacture the official state car for a few heads of state, including for the King of Sweden and the King of the Netherlands.

Armored versions were also available. The first generation could be ordered from the factory, with the actual armoring done by an outside company. The second generation armoured version was available from Czech specialists SVOS and no factory armoring was offered.

See also
Volvo ECC

References

External links

Official website

S80
Sedans
Executive cars
Euro NCAP executive cars
Flagship vehicles
Front-wheel-drive vehicles
All-wheel-drive vehicles
Cars introduced in 1998
2010s cars
Limousines